Jamie Barber (born 1971 in Hampstead, London) is a British restaurateur, founder and CEO of Hush restaurant in Mayfair, London, the Hache Burgers chain and the Cabana Brasilian Barbecue group. He also founded and co-owned restaurants including Villandry, Japanese restaurant Sake No Hana, and Italian casual dining brand, Kitchen Italia.

Barber trained as an entertainment lawyer at media law firm Harbottle & Lewis where he acted for a clients including Sir Roger Moore.  In 2000, he left Harbottle and Lewis to work with Sir Roger’s son, Geoffrey, to create a new venue, Hush, with founding shareholders including Evgeny Lebedev, Geoffrey and Sir Roger Moore. He has since opened two smaller Hush Brasseries in Holborn, and St Paul’s in May 2013. In May 2014, Hush Mayfair received the prestigious "Test of Time" award at the Tatler Restaurant Awards. The award recognises restaurants over 10 years old which, in the words of host/Tatler Restaurant Awards editor Jeremy Wayne, "are still as good as the day they opened." In 2017, Hush's popular cocktail bar, Aviator, received the "Best Bar in London" award at the London Club and Bar Awards

In November 2011, Barber and his business partner, Momo Restaurant founder David Ponté, opened Cabana, a small group of casual Brasilian street food restaurants.

In May 2015 Barber became one of a high-profile consortium, dubbed the 'super eight,' to have backed a £5m funding round for Reds True Barbecue, a fast-growing chain of Yorkshire smokehouse restaurants. Barber also acts as a Board Advisor for Zing Zing, the London-based Chinese takeaway start-up, which caught the eye of Goldman Sachs vice chairman Michael Sherwood, alongside 230 other armchair investors on Crowdcube.

The following year Jamie teamed up with fellow restaurateurs Ed Standring, the former managing director of Richoux Group, and Ian Neill, former chief executive of Wagamama, to buy gourmet burger restaurant group Haché. The group have refurbished the five existing London restaurants and have now opened a sixth in Holborn and a seventh in Kingston.

In July 2021, Barber and former Hear'say singer Myleene Klass founded My Supper Hero a finish at home meal kit start-up which launched to the public in October 2021

In recognition of the contribution Barber has made to the restaurant business, he was nominated at the Tatler Restaurant Awards for "Outstanding Contribution to London Restaurants."

Personal life
Barber is a jazz pianist, and produced and wrote for a band called Primitiva and was signed to Warner/Chappell Music and George Michael’s Aegean Record Label. He is the son of Martin Barber, property entrepreneur and founder of Capital & Regional Properties, and the brother of author Lizzy Barber.

References

British restaurateurs
Living people
1971 births